Kraszewski (feminine: Kraszewska; plural: Kraszewscy) is a Polish noble surname initially given to people originating from a place with red sand. The coat of arms is Jastrzębiec.

People
 Antoni Kraszewski (1797–1870), Polish politician
 Charles S. Kraszewski (born 1962), American translator
 Józef Ignacy Kraszewski (1812–1887), Polish writer
 Kajetan Kraszewski (1827–1896), Polish writer

Fictional
 Waldemar Kraszewski, character on Ultraviolet

See also
 

Polish-language surnames